Khalil Ibrahim Jalal Al Ghamdi (born 2 September 1970) is a Saudi Arabian football referee. He is known for being a referee at the 2007 AFC Asian Cup. He has been a FIFA international referee since 2003.

Biography
Outside of refereeing, he works as a teacher and lives in Riyadh. He also officiated at the 2008 Olympics and the 2006 FIFA Club World Cup, as well as the 2006 FIFA World Cup and 2010 FIFA World Cup qualification phases.

He was preselected as a potential referee for the 2010 FIFA World Cup, with his selection confirmed on 5 February 2010. He refereed the Group A match between Mexico and France on 17 June 2010 and the Group H match between Switzerland and Chile on 21 June 2010. On 6 November 2010, he officiated in the 2010 AFC Cup Final between Al-Qadsia and Al-Ittihad at the Jaber Al-Ahmad International Stadium in Kuwait City.

See also
2007 AFC Asian Cup referees

References

1970 births
Living people
Saudi Arabian football referees
2010 FIFA World Cup referees
FIFA World Cup referees
AFC Asian Cup referees